Marsyandi Rural Municipality  is one of eight municipalities in Lamjung District, Nepal. It has 9 wards and, according to the 2011 census, a population of 18,759 people. Previous portions of Ghanpokhara V.D.C. (all wards), Khudi V.D.C. (all wards), Taghring V.D.C. (all wards), Ghermu V.D.C. (all wards), Bahundanda V.D.C (all wards), Bhulbhule V.D.C (all wards) and  Simpani V.D.C.(all wards) are included in this newly made rural municipality.

Rural municipalities in Lamjung District
Rural municipalities of Nepal established in 2017